Nikola Vukčević is a Montenegrin water polo player   He is a member of the Montenegro men's national water polo team at the 2008 Summer Olympics. The team reached the semifinals, where they were defeated by Hungary and met Serbia in the bronze medal match. He was also the member of the Montenegro men's national water polo team in 2012 Summer Olympics where Montenegro finished 4th. He plays for AEK Athens.

References

Living people
Montenegrin male water polo players
Olympic water polo players of Montenegro
Water polo players at the 2008 Summer Olympics
1985 births
Mediterranean Games bronze medalists for Serbia
Competitors at the 2005 Mediterranean Games
Mediterranean Games medalists in water polo
Galatasaray S.K. (men's water polo) players